Samuel Adewunmi (born 1994) is a British actor. He won Most Promising Newcomer at the British Independent Film Awards as well as receiving a Best Actor nomination for his role in the film The Last Tree (2019). He was nominated for a BAFTA for his role in the BBC drama You Don't Know Me (2021).

He was named a 2019 Screen International Star of Tomorrow.

Early life
Adewunmi was born in Camden, London to a single Nigerian Yoruba mother, a chef. He and his brother grew up on the Maiden Lane Estate just north of King's Cross and St Pancras stations, the same estate where Tin Luck was filmed. He first discovered drama through a school play in year three, and was eight when he put on a community play at the Camden People's Theatre. He trained at Identity School of Acting.

Career
In 2016, Adewunmi played Benedict in the third series of the CBBC Online web series Dixi. He made his feature film debut as Isaac in the 2017 crime film The Hatton Garden Job and guest starred in the Doctor Who series 10 episode "The Eaters of Light"

Adewunmi led the film The Last Tree and signed with United Talent Agency (UTA) shortly after its premiere at the 2019 Sundance Film Festival. For his performance, he won Most Promising Newcomer at the British Independent Film Awards and was nominated for Best Actor. He also received two National Film Awards UK nominations. In 2020, he starred as Carcer Dun in the BBC America adaptation of Terry Pratchett's The Watch and the short film Tin Luck.

In 2021, Adewunmi starred in the ITV thriller Angela Black and led the BBC One adaptation of You Don't Know Me as Hero. For the latter, he was nominated for the British Academy Television Award for Best Actor. Adewunmi will make his professional stage debut starring in the world premiere of Trouble in Butetown at the Donmar Warehouse in February 2023.

Filmography

Film

Television

Awards and nominations

References

External links
 

Living people
1994 births
21st-century English male actors
Alumni of the Identity School of Acting
Black British male actors
English male film actors
English male television actors
English people of Nigerian descent
English people of Yoruba descent
Male actors from London
People from the London Borough of Camden
People from St Pancras, London